René Isidoro García Alvarado  (born 4 April 1961) is a Mexican retired footballer and former manager of Atlante of the Primera División de México.

Playing career
Born in San Luis Potosi, García began playing football with local side Atlético Potosino. He would also play for Atlante F.C., Club Atlas, Correcaminos UAT, Puebla F.C. and Pachuca F.C. Also, he played for Tampico Madero in the 1994-95 season.

Managerial career
He was manager of Atlante, Chiapas and San Luis and also coached at Celaya, Santos Laguna, Cruz Azul and Querétaro.

See also
 MACÍAS CABRERA, Fernando (2007). Fútbol Profesional en México Primera División 1943 - 2007., Editorial Independiente edición, México.

References

External links 

DT profile at Medio Tiempo

1961 births
Living people
Footballers from San Luis Potosí
Association football forwards
Atlético Potosino footballers
Atlante F.C. footballers
Atlas F.C. footballers
Correcaminos UAT footballers
Tampico Madero F.C. footballers
Club Puebla players
C.F. Pachuca players
Liga MX players
Mexican football managers
Atlante F.C. managers
Chiapas F.C. managers
San Luis F.C. managers
Mexican footballers